Baldemu, or Mbazlam, is a nearly extinct Afro-Asiatic language spoken in northern Cameroon. Baldamu is spoken in Bogo commune, Diamaré department, Far North Region by only 5 speakers as of 2012. Speakers have been shifting to Fulfulde.

Name
The language is (or was) known as Baldemu or Baldare to its speakers. It is sometimes rendered Baldamu, Balda, Mbazlam, or Mbazla.

Baldamu is mentioned in Bryan and Westermann's Handbook of African Languages under the name Balda, suspected to be only a toponym. It is most closely related to Giziga, Mofu Duvangar, and Mofu Gudur according to C. Seignobos and H. Tourneux.

Status
Since migrating from the surrounding mountains to the village of Balda, Baldemu speakers have shifted to Fulfulde. Baldemu speakers who migrated to Kaélé similarly shifted to Mundang.

References

Further reading 
MacEachern, S. (2002). Residuals and resistance: Languages and history in the Mandara Mountains. When languages collide: Perspectives on language conflict, language competition and language coexistence, 21-44.
Seignobos, C., & Tourneux, H. (1984). Note sur les Baldamu et leur langue (Nord-Cameroun). Africana Marburgensia, 17(1), 13-30.
Tourneux, H. (1987). Note complémentaire sur les Baldamu et leur langue. Africana Marburgensia, 20(1), 52-58.

External links 
 Baldemu at the Endangered Languages Project

Biu-Mandara languages
Languages of Cameroon
Endangered Afroasiatic languages
Endangered languages of Africa